Bhakta Pundalik is a Marathi movie released on 19 February 1975. The movie has been produced by Ram Devtale and Ram Karve and directed by Dutta Dharmadhikari.

Cast 

The cast includes Yashwant Dutt, Chandrakant Gokhale, Sarla Yeolekar, Saroj Sukhtankar, Lata Karnataki, Heera Chawan & Others.

Soundtrack
The music has been directed by Bhaskar Chandavarkar.

Track listing

References

External links 
 Movie Details - imdb.com
  Movie review - gomolo.com

1975 films
Indian biographical films
1970s Marathi-language films
1970s biographical films